Sorrow and Extinction is the debut full-length Pallbearer album. The CD was released by Profound Lore Records on February 21, 2012 with a double LP version released later in the year by 20 Buck Spin. The album was generally well received and was ranked #1 in Pitchfork's "Top 40 Metal Albums of 2012."

The cover artwork was done by artist Sean Reynolds Williams.

Track listing

All songs written and composed by Pallbearer

Personnel
Brett Campbell – vocals, guitar
Devin Holt – guitar
Joseph Rowland – bass
Zach Stine – drums

References

Pallbearer (band) albums
2012 debut albums
Profound Lore Records albums